Colonel Gajraj Singh Thapa (Nepali: गजराज सिंह थापा) was the first person to establish tea plantation estates in Nepal. Around 1873, Thapa, son-in-law of Prime Minister Jung Bahadur Rana, was on a tour of Darjeeling. He was impressed by the sight of the young tea plants and the taste of the drink he was offered everywhere he went. Upon his return to Nepal, he set up two plantations – the Ilam and Soktim tea estates,  each – and so began Nepal's tea industry. Colonel Thapa was then the Governor General (Bada Hakim) of the eastern region of Nepal.
Translation of various signposts placed in Ilam (shown below), reads that the very first tea saplings planted by Thapa was received as a gift from the Government of China, it was gifted to his father-in-law prime minister Jung Bahadur Rana. According to the signpost the genus of tea planted in the estate were Camellia sinensis/Camellia Assamica/Camellia assamica sub sp Lasiocalyx or cambodensis.

Personal life
Thapa was born c. 1830 to Hemdal Singh Thapa. In 1860, he married Maharajkumari Badan Kumari Rana of Kaski and Lamjung, the eldest child of Sri Teen Jung Bahadur Rana. They had one son and four daughters. The son was Colonel Harka Jung Thapa.

Titles
Colonel of the Nepal Army
Governor General (Bada Hakim, बडा हाकिम) of Eastern Nepal.

References

History of tea
1830 births
Rana regime
Year of death missing